The Pearl Jam 2006 World Tour was a concert tour by the American rock band Pearl Jam to support its eighth album, Pearl Jam.

History
Pearl Jam promoted its self-titled album with tours in North America, Europe, and Australia in 2006. As a warm-up for the tour, European fans were treated to a small show at the London Astoria in London, England on April 20, 2006, where Pearl Jam performed the new material and debuted live performances of "Marker in the Sand" and "Army Reserve". The first leg of the North American tour focused on the Northeastern United States. The band opened with a two-night stand in Toronto, Ontario, Canada at the Air Canada Centre which featured rock band My Morning Jacket as the opening act. Pearl Jam concluded on June 3, 2006, in East Rutherford, New Jersey at Continental Airlines Arena. The band moved to the Midwest and the West Coast for the tour's second leg. The second leg began on June 23, 2006, with a show in Pittsburgh, Pennsylvania at Mellon Arena and ended with a two-night stand at The Gorge Amphitheatre in George, Washington. This tour included three two-night stands opening for Tom Petty and the Heartbreakers on Petty's Highway Companion tour. Sonic Youth opened for Pearl Jam during a majority of the tour's second leg.

Pearl Jam went on to tour Europe for its first time in six years. The band began the 2006 tour with a show on August 23, 2006, in Dublin, Ireland at The Point. The concert gained wide radio play in the UK and Ireland. The band headlined the Reading and Leeds Festivals in August 2006, despite having vowed to never play at a festival again after Roskilde. In an interview in advance of the band's return to the festival circuit, guitarist Stone Gossard commented, "It seems like an era to trust that we're aware enough to get through those bigger shows. We have a heightened awareness of what needs to happen every night so people are as safe as they can possibly be." Vocalist Eddie Vedder started both concerts with an emotional plea to the crowd to look after each other. He commented during the Leeds set that the band's decision to play a festival for the first time after Roskilde had nothing to do with "guts" but with trust in the audience. Safety measures at the festivals included a second barrier in front of the main stage to prevent a crush at the front. The band continued on to the Netherlands, Belgium, Spain, Portugal, France, Switzerland, Italy, Czech Republic, Germany, Austria, and Croatia and concluded on September 30, 2006, in Athens, Greece at OAKA Sports Hall. On September 19, 2006, at the Torino, Italy show at Palaisozaki, Pearl Jam played Pearl Jam in its entirety in order midway through its set.

Following Europe, the band headed to Australia in November of the same year (2006). The Australian tour began on November 7, 2006, in Sydney, before continuing through Brisbane, Melbourne, Newcastle, and Adelaide, and concluding on November 25, 2006, in Perth at Subiaco Oval. Every city on this tour received at least two shows except for Newcastle and Perth; Sydney and Melbourne received three. Pearl Jam finished the year with two shows in Hawaii, headlining a show on December 2, 2006, at Blaisdell Arena in Honolulu and serving as the opening act for the last show of U2's Vertigo Tour at Aloha Stadium on December 9, 2006. Vedder and guitarist Mike McCready joined U2 at the concert for a performance of Neil Young's "Rockin' in the Free World".

The official bootlegs on this tour were available via Pearl Jam's official website in MP3 and lossless FLAC formats. The band's shows at The Gorge Amphitheatre were released as part of the Live at the Gorge 05/06 box set. A DVD documenting the band's shows in Italy entitled Immagine in Cornice was released in 2007.

Tour dates

Festivals and other miscellaneous performances
This concert was a part of "Summerfest"
This concert was a part of "Leeds Festival"
This concert was a part of "Reading Festival"
This concert was a part of "Azkena Rock Festival"

Band members
Pearl Jam
Jeff Ament – bass guitar
Stone Gossard – rhythm guitar, lead guitar
Mike McCready – lead guitar
Eddie Vedder – lead vocals, guitar
Matt Cameron – drums

Additional musicians
Boom Gaspar – Hammond B3 and keyboards

Songs performed

Originals

"1/2 Full"
"Alive"
"All or None"
"Alone"
"Animal"
"Army Reserve"
"Around the Bend"
"Bee Girl"
"Better Man"
"Big Wave"
"Black"
"Blood"
"Brain of J."
"Breakerfall"
"Breath"
"Bu$hleaguer"
"Can't Keep"
"Comatose"
"Come Back"
"Corduroy"
"Daughter"
"Dead Man"
"Dirty Frank"
"Dissident"
"Do the Evolution"
"Don't Gimme No Lip"
"Down"
"Drifting"
"Education"
"Elderly Woman Behind the Counter in a Small Town"
"Even Flow"
"Faithfull"
"Fatal"
"Footsteps"
"Garden"
"Given to Fly"
"Glorified G"
"Go"
"Gods' Dice"
"Gone"
"Green Disease"
"Grievance"
"Hail, Hail"
"Hard to Imagine"	
"I Am Mine"
"I Got Id"
"I'm Open" (snippet)
"Immortality"
"In Hiding"
"In My Tree"
"Indifference"
"Inside Job"
"Insignificance"
"Jeremy"
"Last Exit"
"Leash"
"Leatherman"
"Life Wasted"
"Light Years"
"Long Road"
"Love Boat Captain"
"Low Light"
"Lukin"
"Man of the Hour"
"Marker in the Sand"
"MFC"
"Not for You"
"Nothing as It Seems"
"Nothingman"
"Oceans"
"Of the Girl"
"Off He Goes"
"Once"
"Parachutes"
"Parting Ways"
"Porch"
"Present Tense"
"Rats"
"Rearviewmirror"
"Red Mosquito"
"Release"
"Sad"
"Satan's Bed"
"Save You"
"Severed Hand"
"Sleight of Hand"
"Smile"
"Sometimes"
"Soon Forget"
"Spin the Black Circle"
"State of Love and Trust"
"Thin Air"
"Thumbing My Way"
"Tremor Christ"
"U"
"Undone"
"Unemployable"
"Untitled"
"W.M.A." (snippet)
"Wash"
"Wasted Reprise"
"Whipping"
"Why Go"
"Wishlist"
"World Wide Suicide"
"Yellow Ledbetter"
"You Are"
"You're True"

Covers
"All Along the Watchtower" (Bob Dylan)
"American Girl" (Tom Petty)
"American in Me" (Avengers)
"Androgynous Mind" (Sonic Youth) (snippet)
"Another Brick in the Wall" (Pink Floyd) (snippet)
"Atomic Dog" (George Clinton) (snippet)
"Baba O'Riley" (The Who)
"Baby, Please Don't Go" (Big Joe Williams) (snippet)
"Beast of Burden" (The Rolling Stones) (snippet)
"Beds Are Burning" (Midnight Oil) (snippet)
"Blitzkrieg Bop" (Ramones) (snippet)
"The Boys Are Back in Town" (Thin Lizzy)
"Check on It" (Beyoncé Knowles) (snippet)
"Cinnamon Girl" (Neil Young) (snippet)
"Crazy Mary" (Victoria Williams)
"Crown of Thorns" (Mother Love Bone)
"Don't Be Shy" (Cat Stevens)
"Forever Young" (Bob Dylan)
"Fortunate Son" (Creedence Clearwater Revival)
"Fuckin' Up" (Neil Young)
"Gimme Some Truth" (John Lennon)
"Good Woman" (Cat Power) (snippet)
"Happy Birthday" (traditional)
"Harvest Moon" (Neil Young)
"Hawaiʻi '78" (Israel Kamakawiwo'ole)
"Here's to the State of Mississippi" (Phil Ochs)
"Hunger Strike" (Temple of the Dog)
"I Believe in Miracles" (Ramones)
"I Can't Explain" (The Who)
"I Got You" (Split Enz)
"I Must Not Think Bad Thoughts" (X)
"I Won't Back Down" (Tom Petty)
"Interstellar Overdrive" (Pink Floyd) (snippet)
"It Makes No Difference" (The Band)
"It's OK" (Dead Moon) (snippet)
"Kick Out the Jams" (MC5)
"The Kids Are Alright" (The Who)
"Last Kiss" (Wayne Cochran)
"Leaving Here" (Edward Holland, Jr.)
"Little Sister" (Elvis Presley)
"Little Wing" (Jimi Hendrix)
"Masters of War" (Bob Dylan)
"Modern Girl" (Sleater-Kinney) (snippet)
"Mother" (John Lennon with the Plastic Ono Band) (snippet)
"My Sharona" (The Knack) (snippet)
"No Woman, No Cry" (Bob Marley) (snippet)
"Picture in a Frame" (Tom Waits)
"Rainy Day Women No. 12 & 35" (Bob Dylan)
"Rockin' in the Free World" (Neil Young)
"Romanza" (anonymous) (snippet)
"Ruby Tuesday" (The Rolling Stones) (snippet)
"Save It for Later" (The Beat) (snippet)
"So Lonely" (The Police) (snippet)
"So You Want to Be a Rock 'n' Roll Star" (The Byrds)
"A Sort of Homecoming" (U2) (snippet)
"The Star-Spangled Banner" (Francis Scott Key and John Stafford Smith)
"Throw Your Arms Around Me" (Hunters & Collectors)
"Throw Your Hatred Down" (Neil Young)
"Today Your Love, Tomorrow the World" (Ramones) (snippet)
"The Waiting" (Tom Petty)
"Waiting on a Friend" (The Rolling Stones)
"Walking the Cow" (Daniel Johnston)
"War" (Edwin Starr) (snippet)
"With My Own Two Hands" (Ben Harper) (snippet)
"You've Got to Hide Your Love Away" (The Beatles)

Gallery

References

2006 concert tours
Pearl Jam concert tours